The November 2004 San Francisco general elections were held on November 2, 2004, in San Francisco, California. The elections included seven seats to the San Francisco Board of Supervisors, four seats to the San Francisco Community College Board, four seats to the San Francisco Board of Education, and fourteen San Francisco ballot measures.

Board of Supervisors

Propositions 

Note: "City" refers to the San Francisco municipal government.

Proposition A 

Proposition A would allow the City to issue $200 million in bonds to finance the purchase and maintenance of affordable housing and housing assistance for low- and moderate-income households. This measure required a two-thirds majority to pass.

Proposition B 

Proposition B would allow the City to issue $60 million in bonds to finance the purchase and maintenance of historical resources owned by the City and the San Francisco Unified School District. This measure required a two-thirds majority to pass.

Proposition C 

Proposition C would establish the Health Service System as a separate City department and allow the Health Service Board to appoint and remove the manager for the System.

Proposition D 

Proposition D would change the City Charter regarding the Board of Supervisors by changing deadlines and vote requirements, restrictions on the number of aides, and commissioners' length of service after terms have expired.

Proposition E 

Proposition E would have the City pay to the survivors of a police officer or firefighter who dies in the line of duty 100% of the retirement benefits entitled to the officer or firefighter.

Proposition F 

Proposition F would allow adult noncitizen parents, guardians, and caregivers with children in the San Francisco Unified School District to vote in San Francisco Board of Education elections.

Proposition G 

Proposition G would allow the City to authorize the Health Services Board to establish health plans for City residents.

Proposition H 

Proposition H would name the stadium at Candlestick Point as Candlestick Park, effectively forbidding future naming rights contracts for the current stadium.

Proposition I 

Proposition I would create an Office of Economic Analysis, which will analyze proposed legislation and report its impact on the economy, and have the City create a long-term Economic Development Plan.

Proposition J 

Proposition J would increase the sales tax by ¼%.

Proposition K 

Proposition K would create a temporary 0.1% gross receipts tax and clarify the City's payroll expense tax for certain business entities.

Proposition L 

Proposition L would set aside 15% of hotel tax surcharge revenues for the acquisition, preservation, and maintenance of neighborhood and single-screen movie theaters and to promote the local film industry.

Proposition M 
Proposition M would prohibit the razing of buildings containing 20 or more habitable units. This measure was struck from the ballot due to a technicality.

Proposition N 

Proposition N would make it City policy to urge the federal government to withdraw all troops from Iraq.

Proposition O 

Proposition O would make it City policy to use the sales tax funds from Proposition J for low-income residents and the homeless.

References

External links
 San Francisco Department of Elections

San Francisco 11
2004 11
Elections 11
San Francisco 11